Bedding, also known as bedclothes or bed linen, is the materials laid above the mattress of a bed for hygiene, warmth, protection of the mattress, and decorative effect. Bedding is the removable and washable portion of a human sleeping environment. Multiple sets of bedding for each bed are often washed in rotation and/or changed seasonally to improve sleep comfort at varying room temperatures. Most standardized measurements for bedding are rectangular, but there are also some square-shaped sizes, which allows the user to put on bedding without having to consider its lengthwise orientation (e.g. a  duvet).

In American English, the word bedding generally does not include the mattress, bed frame, or bed base (such as box-spring), while in British English it does. In Australian and New Zealand English, bedding is often called manchester, especially in shops. Manchester was a center of the cotton industry in the late 18th and the 19th century, and into the 20th century, and so cotton goods (principally sheets and towels) were given the name  'Manchester goods', which later was simplified to 'manchester'.

A set of bedding generally consists of at least flat or fitted bed sheet that covers the mattress; a flat top sheet; either a blanket, a quilt, or a duvet. Sometimes with a duvet cover is to be used in addition to or instead of – the top sheet; and a number of pillows with pillowcases, also referred to as pillow shams. (See  for more info on all these terms.) Additional blankets, etc. may be added to ensure the necessary insulation in cold sleeping areas. A common practice for children and some adults is to decorate a bed with plush stuffed animals, dolls, and other soft toys. These are not included under the designation of bedding, although they may provide additional warmth to the sleeper.

Materials
Lightweight white, solid-color or printed plain weave, satin weave, or flannel cotton or cotton/polyester blends are the most common types of sheeting, although linen and silk may also be used, including in combination. Goose or duck down and other feathers are frequently used as a warm and lightweight filling in duvets, comforters and quilts. But such fill can protrude in part even from tightly woven fabric, and be an irritant for many people, particularly those with allergies. Natural and synthetic down alternatives are marketed. Cotton, wool or polyester batting is commonly used as fill in quilts and down alternative comforters. These are less expensive and more easily laundered than natural down or feathers. Synthetic fibers are best in the form of thermofused (where fibers cross) batting. Thick-woven or knitted wool, cotton, acrylic or other microfiber synthetics, or blends of these, are typically used for blankets. The fabric produced from the cotton warp and weft, cotton warp and lyocell weft has a significant improvement in all manner and is best suited for making bed linen.

History
Around 3400 BC Egyptian pharaohs had their beds moved off the ground and slept on a raised surface. Bed linen was widely evolved in Egypt. It was seen as a symbol of light and purity, as well as a symbol of prosperity. The Egyptian mummies were often wrapped in bed linen. The complexity of applications has increased with research and developments in the area of bed linen materials over the years.

Roman Empire mattresses were stuffed with wool, feather, reeds or hay. The beds were decorated with paint, bronze, silver, jewels and gold. Interestingly, it was rare for a Roman couple to spend the night together. It was more common for each spouse to have a separate room. Researchers believe that the Roman bed was definitely less comfortable than today.

During the Renaissance, mattresses were stuffed with straw and feathers and then covered with silks, velvets or satin material. Embroidered canopies and ornamental hangings as well as the advent of the featherbed led to beds becoming extremely expensive, often willed down from generation to generation.

In the 18th century, Europeans began to use bed frames made from cast iron, and mattresses that were made of cotton. Until that time, assorted vermin were simply accepted as a component of even the most royal beds.

In the 19th century the bed spring was invented, also called the box spring.

In the 20th century United States, consumers bought the inner spring mattress, followed in the 1960s by the water bed (originating on the West Coast), and adoption of Japanese-style futons, air mattresses, and foam rubber mattresses and pillows.

Elements

Terminology

 Drop: The vertical dimension of a bed skirt.
 Flanged: Including a decorative band of fabric that is straight or tailored; often used to describe pillows or pillow shams.
 Hotel bedding: sheets with a high-thread count and unadorned designs, marketed to replicate the bedding materials that hotels use. The expansion of business travel has created a consumer demand for such products.
 Mako cotton: A high grade of cotton, the long staple or long fibre of Egyptian-grown cotton has more continuous fibres to use when creating threads or yarns. The yarn is smaller in diameter yet stronger than other cottons. Smaller yarn means that more threads per square inch can be used to create stronger fabrics which are lighter in weight yet breathe well. Mako cotton is frequently used to make upscale sheets and towels, which are marketed as a luxury product.
 Palliasse: Bedding made from strong material, filled with organic material, such as straw or horsehair and used as a mattress.
 Pima cotton: A high grade of cotton. It has the long staple similar to Mako cotton, which is what gives it its softness and luster, as well as its durability. Its superior characteristics improve with wear. Pima cotton is used to make upscale sheets, towels and clothing, which are marketed as a luxury product. Peru produces the most of the world's Pima cotton.
 Pleated: Material that is sewn in folds, like a fan.
 Tailored: Fitted closely, i.e. made to fit the bed exactly.
 Thread count: Usually measured either as the number of threads per square inch (i.e. ) or per 10 cm2 (i.e. ). The two measurement methods will yield different thread count numbers. For example, a count of 250 threads/in2 equals 31.2 threads/cm2.
 Throw blanket (also throw): A small covering usually used for warmth and decoration; it is usually placed at the end of the bed.

Sizes

Bedding sizes are made with consideration of the dimensions of the bed and mattress for which it is to be used. Bed sizes vary around the world, with countries having their own standards and terminology.

See also 
 Bed sheet
 Bed-making
 Blanket
 Comforter
 Duvet
 Futon
 Pillow
 Quilt
 Sleeping bag

References

External links